Ivan Dominic Illich (4 September 1926 – 2 December 2002) was an Austrian Roman Catholic priest, theologian, philosopher, and social critic. His 1971 book Deschooling Society criticises modern society's institutional approach to education, an approach that constrains learning to narrow situations in a fairly short period of the human lifespan. His 1975 book Medical Nemesis, importing to the sociology of medicine the concept of medical harm, argues that industrialised society widely impairs quality of life by overmedicalising life, pathologizing normal conditions, creating false dependency, and limiting other more healthful solutions. Illich called himself "an errant pilgrim."

Biography

Early life
Ivan Dominic Illich was born on 4 September 1926 in Vienna, Austria, to Gian Pietro Ilic (Ivan Peter Illich) and Ellen Rose "Maexie" née Regenstreif-Ortlieb. His father was a civil engineer and a diplomat from a landed Catholic family of Dalmatia, with property in the city of Split and wine and olive oil estates on the island of Brač. His mother came from a Jewish family that had converted to Christianity from Germany and Austria-Hungary (Czernowitz, Bukowina). Ellen Illich was baptized Lutheran but converted to Catholicism upon marriage. Her father, Friedrich "Fritz" Regenstreif, was an industrialist who made his money in the lumber trade in Bosnia, later settling in Vienna, where he built an art nouveau villa.

Ellen Illich traveled to Vienna to be attended by the best doctors during birth. Ivan's father was not living in Central Europe at the time. When Ivan was three months old, he was taken along with his nurse to Split, Dalmatia (by then part of the Kingdom of Yugoslavia), to be shown to his paternal grandfather. There he was baptized on 1 December 1926. In 1929 twin boys, Alexander and Michael, were born in the family.

Work in Europe and the Americas
In 1942, Ellen Illich and her three children—Ivan, Alexander, and Michael—left Vienna, Austria for Florence, Italy, escaping the Nazi persecution of Jews. Illich finished high school in Florence, and then went on to study histology and crystallography at the local University of Florence. Hoping to return to Austria following World War II, he enrolled in a doctorate in medieval history at the University of Salzburg with the hope of gaining legal residency as he was undocumented. He wrote a dissertation focusing on the historian Arnold J. Toynbee, a subject to which he would return in his later years. While working on his doctorate, he returned to Italy where he studied theology and philosophy at the Pontifical Gregorian University in Rome, as he wanted to become a Catholic priest. He was ordained as a Catholic priest in Rome in 1951 and served his first Mass in the catacombs where the early Roman Christians hid from their persecutors.

A polyglot, Illich spoke Italian, Spanish, French, and German fluently. He later learned Croatian, the language of his grandfathers, then Ancient Greek and Latin, in addition to Portuguese, Hindi, English, and other languages.

Following his ordination in 1951, he "signed up to become a parish priest in one of New York's poorest neighborhoods—Washington Heights, on the northern tip of Manhattan, at that time a barrio of newly-arrived Puerto Rican immigrants." In 1956, at the age of 30, he was appointed vice rector of the Catholic University of Puerto Rico, "a position he managed to keep for several years before getting thrown out—Illich was just a little too loud in his criticism of the Vatican's pronouncements on birth control and comparatively demure silence about the nuclear bomb." It was in Puerto Rico that Illich met Everett Reimer and the two began to analyze their own functions as "educational" leaders. In 1959, he traveled throughout South America on foot and by bus.

The end of Illich's tenure at the university came in 1960 as the result of a controversy involving bishops James Edward McManus and James Peter Davis, who had denounced Governor Luis Muñoz Marín and his Popular Democratic Party for their positions in favor of birth control and divorce. The bishops also started their own rival Catholic party. Illich later summarized his opposition:

As a historian, I saw that it violated the American tradition of Church and State separation. As a politician, I predicted that there wasn't enough strength in Catholic ranks to create a meaningful platform and that failure of McManus's party would be disastrous on the already frail prestige of the Puerto Rican Church. As a theologian, I believe that the Church must always condemn injustice in the light of the Gospel, but never has the right to speak in favor of a specific political party.

After Illich disobeyed a direct order from McManus forbidding all priests from dining with Governor Muñoz, McManus ordered Illich to leave his post at the university, describing his presence as "dangerous to the Diocese of Ponce and its institutions."

Despite this display of insubordination and an order from Paul Francis Tanner, then general secretary of the National Catholic Welfare Conference, forbidding Illich from any official role in the organization's Latin American bureau, Illich maintained the support of the influential priest John J. Considine, who continued to push for Illich to have a role in training the Church's missionaries, personally funding trips to Mexico in order for Illich to scout locations.

Following his departure from Puerto Rico, Illich moved to Cuernavaca, Mexico, where he founded the Center of Intercultural Formation (CIF) in 1961, originally as missionary training center. As the center became more influential it became the Centro Intercultural de Documentación (CIDOC, or Intercultural Documentation Center), ostensibly a research center offering language courses to missionaries from North America and volunteers of the Alliance for Progress program initiated by John F. Kennedy. His real intent was to document the participation of the Vatican in the "modern development" of the so-called Third World. Illich looked askance at the liberal pity or conservative imperiousness that motivated the rising tide of global industrial development. He viewed such emissaries as a form of industrial hegemony and, as such, an act of "war on subsistence". He sought to teach missionaries dispatched by the Church not to impose their own cultural values. "Throughout the late 1960s and early 1970s, CIDOC was part language school and part free university for intellectuals from all over the Americas." At the CIDOC, "Illich was able to develop his potent and highly influential critique of Third World development schemes and their fresh-faced agents: Kennedy's Alliance for Progress, the Peace Corps, and countless other missionary efforts bankrolled and organized by wealthy nations, foundations, and religious groups."

After ten years, critical analysis from the CIDOC of the institutional actions by the Church brought the organization into conflict with the Vatican. Unpopular with the local chapter of Opus Dei, Illich was called to Rome for questioning, due in part to a CIA report. While he was not convicted or punished by the Vatican, it was then that he decided to renounce active priesthood. In 1976, Illich, apparently concerned by the influx of formal academics and the potential side effects of its own "institutionalization", shut the center down with consent from the other members of the CIDOC. Several of the members subsequently continued language schools in Cuernavaca, some of which still exist. Illich, who had been made a Monsignor at 33 himself resigned from the active priesthood in the late 1960s, but continued to identify as a priest and occasionally performed private masses.

In the 1970s, Illich was popular among leftist intellectuals in France, his thesis having been discussed in particular by André Gorz. However, his influence declined after the 1981 election of François Mitterrand as Illich was considered too pessimistic at a time when the French Left took control of the government.

In the 1980s and beyond, Illich traveled extensively, mainly splitting his time between the United States, Mexico, and Germany. He held an appointment as a Visiting Professor of Philosophy, Science, Technology and Society at Penn State. He also taught at the University of Bremen and University of Hagen. During his last days of his life he admitted that he was greatly influenced by one of the Indian economists and adviser to M. K. Gandhi, J. C. Kumarappa, most notably, his book, Economy of Permanence.

While Illich never referred to himself as an anarchist in print, he was closely associated with major figures in left-anarchist circles, notably Paul Goodman and unschooling advocate John Holt. Goodman is credited in Deschooling Society with having "radically obliged" Illich to revise his thinking, and described with great affection in Illich's 1990s interviews with David Cayley:

Personality
Ivan Illich called himself "an errant pilgrim", "a wandering Jew and a Christian pilgrim", while clearly acknowledging his Dalmatian roots. He remarked that since leaving the old house of his grandparents on the island Brač in Dalmatia, he had never had a home.

Death
Illich died on 2 December 2002 in Bremen, Germany. Not realised was his last wish: to die surrounded by close collaborators in Bologna amid the creation of his planned, new learning centre.

Philosophical views
Illich followed the tradition of apophatic theology. His lifework's leading thesis is that Western modernity, perverting Christianity, corrupts Western Christianity. A perverse attempt to encode the New Testament's principles as rules of behavior, duty, or laws, and to institutionalize them, without limits, is a corruption that Illich detailed in his analyses of modern Western institutions, including education, charity, and medicine, among others. Illich often used the Latin phrase Corruptio optimi quae est pessima, in English The corruption of the best is the worst.

Illich believed that the Biblical God taking human form, the Incarnation, marked world history's turning point, opening new possibilities for love and knowledge. As in the First Epistle of John, it invites any believer to seek God's face in everyone encountered. Describing this new possibility for love, Illich refers to the Parable of the Good Samaritan.

Influence 

His first book, Deschooling Society, published in 1971, was a groundbreaking critique of compulsory mass education. He argued the oppressive structure of the school system could not be reformed. It must be dismantled in order to free humanity from the crippling effects of the institutionalization of all of life. He went on to critique modern mass medicine. Illich was highly influential among intellectuals and academics. He became known worldwide for his progressive polemics about how human culture could be preserved and expand, activity expressive of truly human values, in the face of multiple thundering forces of de-humanization.

In his several influential books, he argued that the overuse of the benefits of many modern technologies and social arrangements undermine human values and human self-sufficiency, freedom, and dignity. His in-depth critiques of mass education and modern mass medicine were especially, pointed, relevant; and perhaps, more timely now than during his life.

Health, argues Illich, is the capacity to cope with the human reality of death, pain, and sickness. Technology can benefit many; yet, modern mass medicine has gone too far, launching into a godlike battle to eradicate death, pain, and sickness. In doing so, it turns people into risk-averse consuming objects, turning healing into mere science, turning medical healers into mere drug-surgical technicians.

The Dark Mountain Project, a creative cultural movement founded by Dougald Hine and Paul Kingsnorth that abandons the myths of modern societies and looks for other new stories that help us make sense of modernity, drew their inspiration from the ideas of Ivan Illich.

Published works

Deschooling Society

Illich gained public attention with his 1971 book Deschooling Society, a radical critique of educational practice in "modern" economies. Claiming examples of institutionalised education's ineffectiveness, Illich endorses self-directed education, supported by intentional social relations, in fluid informal arrangements:

The final sentence, above, clarifies Illich's view that education's institutionalisation fosters society's institutionalisation, and so de-institutionalising education may help de-institutionalize society. Further, Illich suggests reinventing learning and expanding it throughout society and across persons' lifespans. Particularly striking in 1971 was his call for advanced technology to support "learning webs":

According to a contemporary review in the Libertarian Forum, "Illich's advocacy of the free market in education is the bone in the throat that is choking the public educators." Yet, unlike libertarians, Illich opposes not merely publicly funded schooling, but schools as such. Thus, Illich's envisioned disestablishment of schools aimed not to establish a free market in educational services, but to attain a fundamental shift: a deschooled society. In his 1973 book After Deschooling, What?, he asserted, "We can disestablish schools, or we can deschool culture." In fact, he called advocates of free-market education "the most dangerous category of educational reformers."

Tools for Conviviality

Tools for Conviviality was published in 1973, two years after Deschooling Society. In this newer work, Illich generalizes the themes that he had previously applied to the educational field: the institutionalization of specialized knowledge, the dominant role of technocratic elites in industrial society, and the need to develop new instruments for the reconquest of practical knowledge by the average citizen. He wrote that "[e]lite professional groups ... have come to exert a 'radical monopoly' on such basic human activities as health, agriculture, home-building, and learning, leading to a 'war on subsistence' that robs peasant societies of their vital skills and know-how. The result of much economic development is very often not human flourishing but 'modernized poverty', dependency, and an out-of-control system in which the humans become worn-down mechanical parts." Illich proposed that we should "invert the present deep structure of tools" in order to "give people tools that guarantee their right to work with independent efficiency."

Tools for Conviviality attracted worldwide attention. A résumé of it was published by French social philosopher André Gorz in Les Temps Modernes, under the title "Freeing the Future". The book's vision of tools that would be developed and maintained by a community of users had a significant influence on the first developers of the personal computer, notably Lee Felsenstein.

Medical Nemesis
In his Medical Nemesis, first published in 1975, also known as Limits to Medicine, Illich subjected contemporary Western medicine to detailed attack. He argued that the medicalization in recent decades of so many of life's vicissitudes—birth and death, for example—frequently caused more harm than good and rendered many people in effect lifelong patients. He marshalled a body of statistics to show what he considered the shocking extent of post-operative side-effects and drug-induced illness in advanced industrial society. He introduced to a wider public the notion of iatrogenic disease, which had been scientifically established a century earlier by British nurse Florence Nightingale (1820–1910). Others have since voiced similar views.

To Hell with Good Intentions
In his 1968 speech at the Conference on InterAmerican Student Projects (CIASP), Illich strongly opposes the presence of American Roman Catholic missionaries, the Peace Corps and organizations like the CIASP themselves who invited him to speak- in Mexico. Illich says that the presence of American "do-gooders" is causing more harm than good. Rather, he suggests that the Americans should travel to Latin America as tourists or students, or else stay in their homeland, where they can at least know what they are doing.

List of works
 
 
 
 
 
 
 
 
 
 
 
 
  Coauthored with Barry Sanders
 
 
 
 
 
 
 Disoccupazione creativa (Creative Disoccupation), Italy, Italian, 1977
 : Edited by Prof Sajay Samuel

Honours, decorations, awards and distinctions
Culture and Peace Prize of the Villa Ichon in Bremen (1998)

See also 
Credentialism
Critical pedagogy
Critique of technology
Degrowth
Development criticism
Ecopedagogy
Free software movement
Holistic education
Open Source Ecology
Shadow work

Notes

References

Further reading
 
 
 
 
  Winkler, J.T. The intellectual celebrity syndrome. Lancet, 1987 Feb.21, 1: 450.
 
Wtp.org: Ivan Illich with Jerry Brown — KPFA, 22 March 22, 1996.

 
 
 
  Leonard J. Waks

External links

David Tinapple Collection of Ivan Illich's speeches and books
The International Journal of Illich Studies — an open access, interdisciplinary, peer-reviewed annual publication engaging the thought/writing of Ivan Illich and his circle.''

1926 births
2002 deaths
Austrian male writers
Austrian philosophers
Philosophers of education
Philosophers of technology
Philosophy of artificial intelligence
Philosophers of language
Philosophers of literature
Critics of work and the work ethic
Advocates of unschooling and homeschooling
Humanists
Christian humanists
Christian radicals
Pennsylvania State University faculty
Austrian people of Croatian descent
Jewish emigrants from Austria after the Anschluss
Clergy from Bremen
People from Cuernavaca
20th-century Austrian Roman Catholic priests
Social commentators
Cycling advocates
Austrian Christian socialists
Catholic socialists
Anti-consumerists
20th-century Austrian philosophers
Austrian sociologists
Medical sociologists
Literacy and society theorists
Media critics
Mass media theorists
Historians of printing
Historians of technology
Writers from Vienna